The 1971–72 California Golden Seals season was the team's fifth in the NHL.  The Seals missed the playoffs again, but posted a solid improvement over the previous season and finished sixth in the West Division.

Offseason
In the amateur draft, the Seals did not have a first-round pick. For their first pick, the fifteenth pick overall, in the second round, the Seals chose Ken Baird. At owner Charlie Finley's direction, the team adopted their infamous white skates this season, which were widely ridiculed.

Regular season

Final standings

Schedule and results

Player statistics

Skaters
Note: GP = Games played; G = Goals; A = Assists; Pts = Points; PIM = Penalties in minutes

†Denotes player spent time with another team before joining Seals. Stats reflect time with the Seals only. ‡Traded mid-season

Goaltenders
Note: GP = Games played; TOI = Time on ice (minutes); W = Wins; L = Losses; T = Ties; GA = Goals against; SO = Shutouts; GAA = Goals against average

Playoffs
They didn't qualify for the playoffs

Transactions
The Seals were involved in the following transactions during the 1971–72 season:

Trades

Additions and subtractions

Draft picks

Amateur Draft

Farm teams

See also
 1971–72 NHL season

References
 Golden Seals on Hockey Database
 Golden Seals on Database Hockey

California Golden Seals seasons
Cali
Cali
Calif
Calif